Al-Juwaykhat is a village in Syria in the Homs District, Homs Governorate. According to the Syria Central Bureau of Statistics, al-Juwaykhat had a population of 375 in the 2004 census. Its inhabitants are predominantly Christians.

References

Populated places in Homs District
Eastern Orthodox Christian communities in Syria
Christian communities in Syria